Emmerling is a German surname. Notable people with the surname include:

Adolph Emmerling (1842–1906), German chemist
Björn Emmerling (born 1975), German field hockey player
Franziska Emmerling (born 1975), German chemist
Stefan Emmerling (born 1966), German footballer and manager

German-language surnames